The Academy for Healthcare Science (AHCS) is a United Kingdom body which brings together the UK's Healthcare science community under a common umbrella. It plays an important role in the statutory regulation of Healthcare Scientists following the completion of Modernising Scientific Careers training programme  and works closely with the National School of Healthcare Science

Role and function
The Academy for Healthcare Science has four main roles:

To provide a unified professional voice for the healthcare science workforce
To act as the overarching body for issues related to education, training and development in the UK health system and beyond. This includes both maintaining professional standards and quality management of education and training
To ensure the Healthcare science profession has a high profile that influences and informs the health & care system in the UK
To provide engagement and support for wider strategic scientific initiatives

Registration of healthcare science workforce
The precise arrangements for the regulation of the healthcare science workforce in the UK are still evolving (as at April 2013).  Traditionally, A number of healthcare science disciplines (such as Biomedical Scientists) had protected titles - which means they were required by law to be registered with the Health and Care Professions Council to use particular professional job titles.

The introduction of a new education and training structure under Modernising Scientific Careers has required the development of a common approach to regulation and registration across the disciplines and career levels that takes account of the different legal requirements across the various healthcare science roles. This is being led by the AHCS.

References

External links
 Academy for Healthcare Science

Education in Leicestershire
Health in Leicestershire
Healthcare science in the United Kingdom
Lutterworth
Medical education in the United Kingdom
Organisations based in Leicestershire